Bathyclarias nyasensis is a species of airbreathing catfish endemic to Lake Malawi, in the countries of Malawi, Mozambique and Tanzania.  This species grows to a length of 100 cm SL (39.4 inches).  This species is commercially caught for human consumption.

References
 Kasembe, J. 2005.  Bathyclarias nyasensis.   2006 IUCN Red List of Threatened Species.   Downloaded on 4 August 2007.
 

Bathyclarias
Fish of Africa
Fish described in 1933
Taxa named by E. Barton Worthington
Taxonomy articles created by Polbot